Hurlyburly is a 1998 independent comedy-drama film directed by Anthony Drazan and based on the 1984 play of the same name by David Rabe, who adapted the screenplay. The film is about the intersecting lives of several Hollywood players and wannabes. Rabe condensed the action of his three-hour plus play into two hours and updated the setting from the mid-1980s to the late 1990s.

Plot

Eddie, a cocaine-addicted womanizing casting director, lives in the Hollywood Hills, where his friend Mickey has come to stay with him temporarily after a fallout with his wife. Along with their buddies, Artie and out-of-work actor Phil, Eddie and Mickey live a life of decadence and immorality. Eddie is in love with Darlene, but she is also seeing the married Mickey. Eddie comes to question his lifestyle and purpose, while Mickey is content with his situation. Through a haze of drugs and booze, the four friends inch closer to rock bottom.

Cast
 Sean Penn as Eddie
 Kevin Spacey as Mickey
 Robin Wright as Darlene
 Chazz Palminteri as Phil
 Garry Shandling as Artie
 Anna Paquin as Donna
 Meg Ryan as Bonnie
 Gianna Ranaudo as Susie

Production 
Anthony Drazan and David Rabe said some unnamed famous actors they approached to star in the film turned them down due to the depiction of drug use. The low-budget production was able to secure financing through the sale of foreign distribution rights, in addition to the actors working for minimal salaries.

Filming took place in the Hollywood Hills from December 1997 to January 1998.

Reception

Box office
Opening in 16 theaters, the film grossed $164,826 in its opening weekend; the widest release the film ever got was in 84 theaters. As the film only had a budget of $4 million, this was considered a "strong" opening for a limited release. The film grossed a total of $1,798,862.

Critical reception
Hurlyburly has a 58% rating on Rotten Tomatoes based on 38 reviews with the consensus: "Though Hurlyburly offers a showcase of powerhouse performances from its leads, it's held back by a meandering narrative and verbose explorations of cynicism."

Roger Ebert gave the film 3/4 stars and said Penn gives "a remarkable performance." Stephen Holden of The New York Times said, "In evoking the casual cruelty of contemporary life in a certain time and place, this screen adaptation of David Rabe's play is a misanthropic triumph." In a negative review, Edward Guthmann of the San Francisco Chronicle called the film "a misbegotten mess." Guthmann argued, "Instead of keeping the rude spirit that drove the play, Drazan takes the material too seriously and tries to refashion it as an allegory for our demoralized times -- even though, 14 years later, its observations, cultural idioms and druggie characters are all dated."

The film also attracted criticism for its depiction of women. The character of Donna (played by Anna Paquin, then fifteen-years-old) is given as a "gift" to Eddie and Mickey from Artie. Another character, Bonnie, is treated as an object to be gifted to Phil.

Awards and nominations 
At the 1998 Venice Film Festival, Penn's performance won him the Volpi Cup and Drazan was nominated for the Golden Lion. Penn was also nominated for Best Male Lead at the Independent Spirit Awards.

Promotion
Sean Penn and Garry Shandling gave the film a plug during the final episode of The Larry Sanders Show, in which Sean Penn tells Larry "off camera" that Garry Shandling was an insecure and awful actor who was always trying to get into his wife's trailer.

References

External links
 
 
 
 

1998 films
1998 drama films
American comedy-drama films
American independent films
1998 independent films
American films based on plays
Films directed by Anthony Drazan
Films set in Los Angeles
Films about actors
Films about drugs
Films about cocaine
Films about Hollywood, Los Angeles
1990s English-language films
1990s American films
1990s buddy comedy-drama films
American buddy comedy-drama films